The Ministry of Health of the Republic of Croatia is the ministry in the Government of Croatia which is in charge of health care and welfare.

The current Minister of Health, serving in the Cabinet of Andrej Plenković, is Vili Beroš.

The longest serving Minister of Health (and the only one to serve multiple terms) was Andrija Hebrang, who held the position for a total of 7 years and 343 days, during the administrations of six Croatian Prime Ministers.

List of ministers

Notes
 nb 1.   Served as Minister of Health and Social Welfare

References

External links
Official website 

Health and Social Welfare
Croatia
Croatia
Medical and health organizations based in Croatia